Qaid ("commander"; pl. ), also spelled kaid or caïd, is a word meaning "commander" or "leader." It was a title in the Norman kingdom of Sicily, applied to palatine officials and members of the curia, usually to those who were Muslims or converts to Islam. Later the word was used in North Africa for the governor of a fortress or the warden of a prison, also in Spain and Portugal in the form with the definite article "alcayde" (Spanish) "alcaide" (Portuguese). It is also used as a male Arabic given name.

Notable qaids
Al Qaid Johar (active 950–992), A Slavic general who conquered Maghreb for the Fatimid Imam-Caliph, Al-Mu'izz li-Din Allah; and later served as the Viceroy of the Fatimid State. 
Thomas Brun (active 1137–1154), Englishman who served Roger II of Sicily
Ahmed es-Sikeli, known as Caid Peter (active 1160s), eunuch in the court of Sicily, confidant of Margaret of Navarre
Caïd Richard (died 1187) Great Chamberlain under William I of Sicily and Margaret of Navarre
Murat Reis the younger 17th Century Dutch renegado appointed Caid over the region including the kasbah of El-Oualidia, the port of Saffia, and Maladia (Muladie) by the Sultan of Morocco
Sir Harry MacLean (1848–1920), Scottish soldier, and instructor to the Moroccan Army
Muhammad Ali Jinnah (1876–1948),was given the title of Qaid-Azam or "The Great Leader" as the founder of Pakistan.
Thami El Glaoui (1879–1956), one of the Lords of the Atlas
Grands caids, Berber feudal rulers of southern quarter of Morocco under the French Protectorate

People with the given name
Qaid ibn Hammad (1028–1045), ruler of Algeria
Kaid, nickname of Andrew Belton, (1882—1970), British Army officer active in Morocco
Kaïd Ahmed (1921–1978), Algerian nationalist and politician
Béji Caïd Essebsi (1926–2019), Elected Tunisian president 
Al-Qaid Joher Izz al-Din (1942), Indian Islamic Leader
Kaid Mohamed (born 1984), Welsh footballer

Alcaide as surname
Anselmo Pardo Alcaide (1913-1977), Spanish entomologist.
Chris Alcaide (1922–2004) American actor
Carmen Alcayde (born 1973), Spanish TV presenter and actress
David Alcaide (born 1978), Spanish pool player
Guillermo Alcaide (born 1986), Spanish tennis player
Ana Alcaide (born 1976), Spanish musician

Places
 Draâ El-Kaïd, town in Algeria
 Alcaide, Fundão, town in Portugal

Other uses
Alkaid or Elkeid, traditional name of Arabic origin for star Eta Ursae Majoris
USS Alkaid (AK-114), U.S. Navy ship, named after the star
Qaid (film), 1975 Hindi film starring Leena Chandavarkar and Kamini Kaushal
Umar Qaid, 1975 Hindi Bollywood action film
The Kingdom of Caid, Society for Creative Anachronism, encompasses Southern California, the Las Vegas metropolitan area, and Hawaii.
Khuddamul Ahmadiyya chapter leaders are called Qaid. The Qaid in this terminology is a Muslim youth leader who guides his local khuddam in services to faith and nation. 
In the game Tom Clancy's Rainbow Six Siege, an operator has the name 'Kaid', with the ability to electrify defenses with his unique gadget.
In the 1965 science fiction novel Dune, a 'Caid' is a Sardaukar officer assigned to deal with civilians.

References

Arabic masculine given names
Sicilian Arabs
Arabic words and phrases
Kingdom of Sicily